Grey King may refer to:
A fictional Marvel Comics character, see Cerebro's X-Men.
The Grey King, a novel